Nyamindi is a settlement in Kenya's Central Province.

References 

Nyamindi is also the name of the river on which the town is situated and arises from the melt waters of the snows of Mount Kenya.

Populated places in Central Province (Kenya)